Renato Arapi (born 28 August 1986) is an Albanian professional football coach, former left-back and centre-back.

Club career

Early career
Arapi first joined local club Teuta Durrës in 1993 as a young child, where he would remain for 9 years, playing for the different youth teams within the club before leaving in 2002 to join Dinamo Tirana. Following his move he was placed into the U19 side with Dinamo Tirana, where his impressive displays earned him a call up to the senior side towards the end of the 2002–03 season, where he made his professional debut against his first club Teuta Durrës on 3 May 2003 in a 2–0 loss for Arapi's side. He was loaned out to Albanian First Division side Erzeni Shijak for the 2003–04 season, where he failed to break through into the first team and only made 2 appearances for the club during his loan spell before returning to Dinamo Tirana. In the summer transfer window in 2005, Arapi left Dinamo Tirana after failing to establish himself in the first team at the club, and he joined newly promoted Albanian Superliga side Besa Kavajë.

Besa Kavajë
Arapi joined Besa Kavajë and quickly established himself as a first team regular, playing in 19 league games and scoring one goal in his first season with the club, helping them to a respectable mid table 5th finish. The following season Besa Kavajë continued their good performances in the league, finishing once again in mid table, 6th out of 12 teams. Arapi was also a key figure in the club's Albanian Cup campaign which saw him win his first major trophy after beating Teuta Durrës 3–2 in the final. The following season he played the first half of the season with Besa Kavajë before going on a trial with Danish side Silkeborg and eventually joining the club on loan in January 2008 after impressing the management.

Silkeborg
He joined newly relegated Danish 1st Division side Silkeborg as a 21-year-old on a one-year loan deal from Besa Kavajë in January 2008 after initially impressing the club on trial. He joined the club mid season and featured in 10 league games, helping his side to a 3rd-place finish at the end of the 2007–08 season, missing out on the second promotion place to SønderjyskE. The following season he struggled for playing time, and only featured in 13 league games, but his side had a successful season in which they finished as runners-up in the league and earned promotion to the Danish Superliga. His loan deal expired at the end of the 2008–09 season and Silkeborg did not take up the option to sign Arapi permanently, thus meaning that he returned to his parent club Besa Kavajë.

Return to Albania
After a spell away from Albanian football, Arapi returned to his homeland in the summer of 2009 and quickly became an important first team player once again at Besa Kavajë, who had one of their best seasons in their history, after they finished as runners-up in the Albanian Superliga and they won the Albanian Cup. Arapi played in 31 league games and was a key driving force in Besa Kavajë's cup success, and he scored in the cup final against Vllaznia Shkodër in the 85th minute to take it to extra time, which is when Besa won the cup 2–1 over 120 minutes.

Skënderbeu Korçë
On 12 June 2015, Arapi signed a new one-year extension to his contract, lengthening his Skënderbeu Korçë career to 6 seasons.

On 14 June 2016, Arapi officially announced his departure from the club after six years via an open later to the fans. He stated that the left the club for familial reasons. He, along with Bledi Shkëmbi and Orges Shehi were the only players that won six consecutive league titles for the club.

Partizani Tirana
On 17 June 2016, Arapi joined fellow Albanian Superliga side Partizani Tirana on free transfer, signing a one-year contract. He was given the squad number 3, and made his competitive debut on 28 June in 2016–17 UEFA Europa League first qualifying round against Slovan Bratislava, which ended in a goalless draw.

Back to Teuta Durrës
On 30 January 2019, Arapi moved back to his home country after over two years in Turkey, and joined Teuta Durrës. After helping them win 3 trophies as captain, he retired on 19 August 2021.

Post-playing career
After retiring from playing, on 20 August 2021, Teuta announced that Arapi would become their new sporting director.

International career
Arapi was selected by Josip Kuže for a friendly against Argentina on 20 June 2011, receiving thus his first call-up to the senior side. He made his debut in the game which ended in a 4–0 loss by entering as an 81st-minute substitute.

Career statistics

Club

International

Honours

Club
Besa Kavajë
 Albanian Cup (2): 2006–07, 2009–10

Silkeborg
 Danish 1st Division runner-up (1): 2008–09

Skënderbeu Korçë
 Albanian Superliga (6): 2010–11, 2011–12, 2012–13, 2013–14, 2014–15, 2015–16
 Albanian Supercup (2): 2013, 2014

Teuta Durrës
 Albanian Superliga (1): 2020–21
 Albanian Supercup (1): 2020

Individual
 Albanian Superliga Team of the Year: 2013–14

References

External links

 
 
 Silkeborg IF profile
 

1986 births
Living people
People from Sukth
Association football defenders
Albanian footballers
Albania international footballers
KF Teuta Durrës players
FK Dinamo Tirana players
KF Erzeni players
Besa Kavajë players
Silkeborg IF players
KS Shkumbini Peqin players
KF Skënderbeu Korçë players
Boluspor footballers
Albanian expatriate footballers
Expatriate men's footballers in Denmark
Albanian expatriate sportspeople in Denmark
Expatriate footballers in Turkey
Albanian expatriate sportspeople in Turkey
Kategoria Superiore players
Albanian football managers
KF Teuta Durrës managers
Kategoria Superiore managers